Dearham is a civil parish in the borough of Allerdale in Cumbria, England.  It contains two listed buildings that are recorded in the National Heritage List for England.  Of these, one is listed at Grade I, the highest of the three grades, and the others are at Grade II, the lowest grade.  The parish contains the village of Dearham and the surrounding countryside. The listed buildings consist of a church and a milestone.


Key

Buildings

References

Citations

Sources

Lists of listed buildings in Cumbria